Grigoriis Musikiysky (1670 – 1740; also known as Grigoriis Semyonovich Musikiysky or Grigory Musikiysky) was a Russian painter and engraver.

Musikiysky painted primarily portraits of Russian nobility, many of which were created as portrait miniatures. His frequent medium was painting enamel on gold or copper. He died in 1740.

References

1670 births
1740 deaths
17th-century Russian painters
Russian male painters
18th-century painters from the Russian Empire
Russian engravers